The Woolies were an American rock band from Lansing, Michigan. It was formed in 1964 by Bob Baldori, Stormy Rice, Jeff Baldori, Ron English, and Bee Metros.  Their cover of "Who Do You Love?" became a regional hit when it was released as a single in 1966. "Who Do You Love" peaked at # 95 on the Billboard Hot 100.  Dunhill Records dropped the band after they failed to achieve much further success.  In 1968, Stormy Rice left the band to begin a solo career and was replaced by Zocko Groendahl.  The Woolies final release, a compilation of songs dating from 1965 to 1975 was titled Ride, Ride, Ride.

Discography

Albums
 Basic Rock (1972)
 Live at Lizards (1973)
 Ride, Ride, Ride (2006)

Singles
 "Black Crow Blues" (1965)
 "Who Do You Love?" (1966)
 "Duncan and Brandy" (1967)

References

External links
 City Pulse Woolies 50th Anniversary interview, June 2015
 
 The Woolies (Rusted Chrome: Southeast Michigan's Bands and Musicians, 1966–72)
 https://michiganrockandrolllegends.com/index.php/mrrl-hall-of-fame/392-woolies

Musical groups from Detroit
Musical groups established in 1964
Rock music groups from Michigan